Mark Allen Smith (born 2 January 1973) is an English former footballer who played in the Football League for Crewe Alexandra.

He started as a trainee at Nottingham Forest before being signed by Crewe in 1992. During three seasons at Crewe, he played in 82 games. Playing For Crewe at Darlington in a Third Division match on 12 March 1994, he was sent off after 19 seconds.

References

1973 births
Living people
English footballers
Association football goalkeepers
English Football League players
Footballers from Birmingham, West Midlands
Nottingham Forest F.C. players
Crewe Alexandra F.C. players
Walsall F.C. players
Cardiff City F.C. players
Rushden & Diamonds F.C. players
Bedford Town F.C. players
Morecambe F.C. players
Scarborough F.C. players